"Kick Me" is a song performed by American post-hardcore band Sleeping With Sirens released on November 10, 2014 on Epitaph Records. The song was produced by John Feldmann and is the lead single off of the band's fourth studio album Madness, released on March 17, 2015. The song marks the band's first release on Epitaph Records following their departure from their former label Rise Records. "Kick Me" won Song of the Year award by Alternative Press.

Background

The band debuted "Kick Me" live at Camden Underworld on August 21, 2014 in London, England. It was also part of the band's set list on their five month long tour with Pierce the Veil in November 2014, dubbed 'The World Tour'. Speaking about the meaning behind the song, singer Kellin Quinn stated, "It doesn't matter what anyone thinks about you, as long as you know who you are inside."

Music video

The music video for the song was shot on location at Camden Underworld live during the band's set in London, England. It premiered on the official Epitaph Records YouTube channel on Monday, November 10, 2014. It was directed by the Sitcom Soldiers.

Track listing

Charts

Release history

References

2014 singles
Epitaph Records singles
2014 songs
Sleeping with Sirens songs
Song recordings produced by John Feldmann
Songs written by John Feldmann
Songs written by Nicholas Furlong (musician)